List of Norwegian Football Cup champions. Clubs from Northern Norway were not allowed to participate in the Norwegian Football Cup until 1963.

List

References

Finals